Antonina Fedorovna Prikhot'ko (April 26, 1906 in Pyatigorsk, Russia – September 29, 1995 in Kyiv, Ukraine), was a Russian-born Ukrainian Soviet experimental physicist. She was an Academician of the National Academy of Sciences of Ukraine and is known for her fundamental contributions to the condensed matter spectroscopy.

Career

Prikhot'ko was accepted to the Leningrad Polytechnical Institute in 1923 and graduated in 1929. Still as a Junior, she started research on spectroscopy under the supervision of Ivan V. Obreimov, and finally earned a PhD in this field under his guidance. In 1930, she moved to the newly established Kharkov Institute of Physics and Technology for working with Obreimov on low-temperature spectroscopy of molecular crystals, a field pioneered by him, in the first in the USSR cryogenic laboratory created by Lev Shubnikov. This research was primary focused on comparing the spectra of vapors and crystals of weakly interacting molecules that at low temperature manifest a number of narrow bands due to the freezing-out the thermal motion of molecules. In this way Obreimov and Prikhot'ko investigated a wide class of inorganic and organic molecular crystals and detected optically low-temperature transitions between their different phases. The principal technical advances were in taking absorption spectra in polarized light and measuring dispersion, including the anomalous dispersion near the absorption lines, at low temperatures. During WWII Prikhot'ko worked in the city of Ufa where a number of Institutions of the Ukrainian Academy of Sciences was evacuated. Since 1944 Prikhot'ko worked in Kyiv, in the Institute of Physics, where here husband, a prominent Soviet nuclear physicist Aleksandr Leipunskii, was appointed as a Director. There she established a Division of the Physics of Crystals.

The principal discovery of Prikhot'ko was published in her 1944 paper based on the experimental data collected still in Kharkov, and in her 1948 follow-up paper. She reported the discovery in the absorption spectra of monocrystals of naphthalene two new bands that were polarized along the symmetry axes of the crystal, as distinct from the majority of bands that there present in both components of the spectrum at the same frequencies. Because individual molecules in crystalline naphthalene are tilted with respect to the crystal axes, existence of strongly polarized absorption bands proved unambiguously that electronic excitation is not localized at individual molecules but propagates across the crystal. Prikhot'ko' discovery stimulated development of Davydov' theory of molecular excitons for crystals including several molecules in a unit cell. While existence of excitons was predicted previously by Yakov Frenkel and afterwards by Gregory Wannier and Nevill Mott, Prikhot'ko' was the first convincing experimental discovery of excitons. The follow-up experiments on low-temperature spectra of benzine crystals confirmed agreement between the theory and experiment.

During the following years Prikhot'ko and her collaborators investigated spectra of a number of crystals, and her personal favorite has been crystalline oxygen where electronic excitations combine with magnetic ones.

Since 1965 Prikhot'ko served as a Director of the Institute of Physics of the National Academy of Sciences of Ukraine. She was awarded a Lenin prize for her scientific achievements and a title of a Hero of Socialist Labor.

See also

 Exciton

Further reading
 A.S Davydov, Theory of Molecular Excitons (Plenum, NY) 1971
 V. L. Broude, E. I. Rashba, and E. F. Sheka, Spectroscopy of molecular excitons (Springer, NY) 1985

External links
 Institute of Physics of the National Academy of Sciences of Ukraine
М.Т. Шпак, Антонина Федоровна Прихотько (К шестидесятилетию со дня рождения), Usp. Fiz. Nauk 90, 395 (1966)

References

1906 births
1995 deaths
Ukrainian women physicists
Russian women physicists
NASU Institute of Physics